Dörbet may refer to:
 
 Dörbet Oirat, one of the four Oirat tribes of Dzungaria
 Eastern Dörbet, a Khorchin-Kharchin Mongol tribe